Beginnings: The Best of the Early Years is a greatest hits compilation album by Irish group Clannad. The albums contains tracks from most of the group's 1970s albums, and was released in August 2008.

Track listing - CD1
"Na Buachaillí Álainn"
"An Mhaighdean Mara"
"Down by the Sally Gardens"
"Dúlamán (Seaweed)"
"Crann Úll"
"Rince Briotánach (Breton Dance)"
"Mhorag’s Na Horo Gheallaidh"
"Thíos Chois Na Trá Domh"
"Teidhir Abhaile Riú"
"An tÚll"
"‘dTigeas A Damhsa? (Children’s Dance Song)"
"Planxty Browne"
"Nil Sé Ina La"
"Cumha Eoghain Rua Uí Néill"
"Coinleach Ghlas an Fhómhair"

Track listing - CD2
"The Green Fields of Gaothdobhair"
"Siúil A Rún"
"An Buinneán Buí"
"Mhaire Bruinneall"
"Eleanor Plunkett"
"Siobhán Ní Dhuibhir"
"Two Sisters"
"Bruach Na Carraige Báine"
"Ar A Ghabháil ‘n A ‘chuain Domh"
"Éirigh Suas A Stóirín"
"Fairly Shot of Her"
"Buaireadh An Phósta"
"Gaoth Barra na dTonn"
"Mrs. McDermott"
"Lá Coimhthíoch Fán dTuath"
"An Pháirc"

References

Clannad compilation albums
2008 greatest hits albums